is a former Japanese football player and manager.

Playing career
Maeda was born in Kagoshima Prefecture on 3 February 1969. He played as center back at many clubs. After graduating from National Institute of Fitness and Sports in Kanoya, he joined Matsushita Electric (later Gamba Osaka) in 1991. However he could not play at all in the match. In 1993, he moved to Japan Football League (JFL) club PJM Futures (later Sagan Tosu). He played many matches in 2 seasons. In 1995, he moved to JFL club Fukuoka Blux (later Avispa Fukuoka). Although the club won the champions and was promoted to J1 League, he could not play many matches. In 1996, he moved to Yokohama Flügels. He played as regular player in 3 seasons. The club won the 2nd place 1997 Emperor's Cup and the champions 1998 Emperor's Cup. However the club was disbanded end of 1998 season due to financial strain, he moved to Júbilo Iwata in 1999. The club won the champions 1999 J1 League and 1998–99 Asian Club Championship. In 2000, he moved to FC Tokyo. However he could not play at all in the match and he moved to Avispa Fukuoka in April 2000. Although he played as regular player in 2 seasons, the club was relegated to J2 League end of 2001 season. In 2002, he moved to Vissel Kobe. In August 2002, he moved to J2 club Sagan Tosu. In 2003, he moved to his local club Volca Kagoshima in Regional Leagues. He played as playing manager in 2 seasons and retired end of 2004 season.

Coaching career
In 2003, when Maeda was player, he became a playing manager at his local club Volca Kagoshima in Regional Leagues. End of 2004 season, he retired from playing career and left the club. In 2005, he moved to Vissel Kobe and became a coach. In 2011, he returned to Volca Kagoshima and became a coach. In 2012, he moved to J2 League club Avispa Fukuoka and became a manager. However the club results were bad and he was sacked in October 2012. In 2013, he moved to J2 club Gainare Tottori. In August, manager Norio Omura was sacked and Maeda became new manager. Although he managed 14 matches, the club failed to win even one match. The club was relegated to J3 League and Maeda was sacked end of season. In 2014, he signed with L.League club INAC Kobe Leonessa. Although the club won the champions for 3 years in a row until 2013, the club results were bad in 2014 and he was sacked in October when the club was the 5th place.

Club statistics

Managerial statistics

References

External links
 
 

1969 births
Living people
National Institute of Fitness and Sports in Kanoya alumni
Association football people from Kagoshima Prefecture
Japanese footballers
Japan Soccer League players
J1 League players
J2 League players
Japan Football League (1992–1998) players
Gamba Osaka players
Sagan Tosu players
Avispa Fukuoka players
Yokohama Flügels players
Júbilo Iwata players
FC Tokyo players
Vissel Kobe players
Japanese football managers
J2 League managers
Avispa Fukuoka managers
Gainare Tottori managers
Association football defenders